Savage: The Ultimate Quest for Survival is a 1996 educational video game by Discovery Channel.

Plot and gameplay 
The player plays as a lion in the Serengeti who has to hunt prey in order to survive.

Critical reception 
Rebecca B. Anderson of GameSpot wrote that while the game was aesthetically pleasing, it was not fun as a "game". Bob Strauss of Entertainment Weekly thought the virtual Serengeti was the "real star" of the title.

References 

1996 video games
Video games developed in the United States